The Flag of the province of Friesland or Frisian flag (West Frisian: Fryske Flagge), is the official flag of the Netherlands province of Friesland.

It consists of four blue and three white diagonal stripes; in the white stripes are a total of seven red pompeblêden, leaves of the yellow water-lily, that may resemble hearts, but according to the official instructions "should not be heart-shaped".

Symbolism 

The seven red seeblatts (or pompeblêden, as they are called in West Frisian) are a reference to the Frisian "sea countries" in the Middle Ages: independent regions along the coast from Alkmaar to the Weser who were allied against the Vikings. There were never precisely seven distinct regions, but the number seven probably has the connotation "many." Some sources hold, however, that there have been seven Frisian lands: West Friesland, Westergoa, Eastergoa, Hunsingo, Fivelingo, Emsingo, and Jeverland.

The pompeblêden are used in other related flags such as the flag of the Ommelanden in neighbouring Groningen Province, a historically Frisian area, and for a proposed pan-Frisia flag put forth by the Groep fan Auwerk.

History 

In the 13th century, a flag with pompeblêdden is described in the Middle High German epic poem Gudrunlied:

 Noch ſihe ich hie bî weiben einen vanen breit
 von wolkenblâwen ſîden. daȥ ſi iu geſeit:
 den bringet uns her Herwîc dâ her von Sêlande.
 ſêbleter ſwebent dar inne...

 [There I see uplifted a flag outspreading wide;
 Of sky-blue silk 'tis woven. The truth I will not hide;
 Herwic bears this banner, he in the Sealands dwelling.
 Sea-leaves are shown upon it...]

Around 1200 Scandinavian coats of arms reveal many traces of water-lilies and hearts, found often in combination with images of lions.

15th century books on heraldry show that two armorial bearings were derived from the early ones: a coat of arms showing lions and seven pompeblêdden (water lilies) transformed into billets, the other being the arms with the seven now known lilies on stripes.

The current design was officially approved in 1897 and was first used by the provincial government in 1927.

See also
Flags of Frisia

References

External links

Site of the province of Friesland

Flags of the Netherlands
Culture of Friesland
Flags introduced in 1957